Pablo Valencia, a prospector, is remembered primarily for his extraordinarily close brush with death in August 1905. Valencia, on the route with one Jesús Rios to an Arizona claim, realized belatedly that they had not brought enough water to sustain themselves, and sent his companion to secure more. Rios did so, but afterwards could not find his partner for want of an agreed-upon meeting place; Valencia, consequently, found himself alone and waterless in the middle of the Sonoran Desert. In this state, he wandered for more than six days with nothing but his own urine and what moisture he could coax from a single scorpion to drink, growing ever weaker. More dead than alive, he eventually reached the only source of water for miles in any direction, Tinajas Altas. There he was nursed back to health by W. J. McGee, who wrote of his ordeal in a paper, "Desert Thirst as Disease."

See also 
 Dehydration
 Sonoran Desert
 W. J. McGee
 The year 1905

References

External links
Recounting of Valencia's Experience

People from Yuma County, Arizona
American prospectors
Year of death missing
Year of birth missing